George Plummer (December 1, 1785 – June 2, 1872) was an American lawyer, farmer, and politician.

Plummer, a native of Glastonbury, Conn., the son of Isaac and Abigail E (Mills) Plummer, was born 1 Dec, 1785.  He graduated from Yale College in 1804.  He studied law with his uncle, Judge Mills, of New Haven, until his admission to the bar in March, 1807. He then settled in Glastenbury, and continued in the practice of law, until the death of his father, in April, 1812, obliged him to choose between the abandonment of the farm which he inherited and his profession.  He decided on the life of a farmer, and never returned to the law.  During the summer of 1814 he was in active service in the war with Great Britain. In 1844 and 1851 Mr. Plummer represented the 2d District in the Connecticut State Senate, and during both years was ex officio a member of the Corporation of Yale College. He was chosen a Deacon of the Congregational Church in Glastenbury, in 1827, and held that office until his death, which occurred on the 2d of June, 1872.

He married, 7 May 1807, Anne, eldest daughter of Rev. William Lockwood of Glastenbury. She died 25 Dec, 1859. Of their three children, two daughters died in early married life (one of them was married to Samuel Rockwell), and one son survived.

External links

1785 births
1872 deaths
People from Glastonbury, Connecticut
Yale College alumni
Connecticut lawyers
Connecticut state senators
American military personnel of the War of 1812
19th-century American politicians